The 1903 Tennessee Volunteers football team represented the University of Tennessee in the 1903 Southern Intercollegiate Athletic Association football season.  The team was coached by Hubert Fisher in his second and final season at Tennessee.  The Volunteers went 4–5 overall with a record of 2–4 in the Southern Intercollegiate Athletic Association (SIAA).

Schedule

References

Tennessee
Tennessee Volunteers football seasons
Tennessee Volunteers football